Ailis Egan (born 4 February 1984) is a retired female rugby union player. She was a member of the Irish team to the 2014 Women's Rugby World Cup.

Egan attended Trinity College Dublin, where she first started playing rugby.

References

External links
Irish Rugby Player Profile

1984 births
Living people
Irish female rugby union players
Ireland women's international rugby union players
Alumni of Trinity College Dublin
Old Belvedere R.F.C. players
Leinster Rugby women's players